Plaquemine High School is a public high school located at 59595 Belleview Drive in unincorporated Iberville Parish, Louisiana, United States, south of the City of Plaquemine. It schools grades seven to twelve and is administered by the Iberville Parish School Board.

 it is the sole remaining traditional high school in Iberville Parish.

History

Plaquemine High school was originally located at 58060 Plaquemine Street. The building, erected in 1911 in Classical Revival style, hosted the school until a new facility was built in 1931, and is currently housing the Iberville Parish Optional Education Center.

The 1931 building was located at 24130 Ferdinand Street and is currently housing the City of Plaquemine Activity Center (COPAC). In 1974 the school has been located at its current location.

The 1911 building was added to the National Register of Historic Places on February 13, 1992.

After North Iberville High School in Rosedale closed in 2009 students were reassigned to Plaquemine High. Rosedale parents criticized the rezoning to Plaquemine High because of the perceived long distances involved.

Academics
The students at Plaquemine High School are required to take seven classes per day, with an optional vo-tech (which offers shop, drafting and home economics courses) or a college-bound curriculum which includes Calculus, Physics and Spanish as a foreign language.

Student life
The school also has many clubs such as The National Beta Club, Key Club, Student Council, 4-H, ROTC Drill Team, and many other clubs.

School uniforms
The district requires all students to wear school uniforms.
Green Polo Shirt and khaki pants or shorts for the 7th & 8th grade.
Green Polo Shirt and khaki pants or shorts for the 9th-12th Grade. Seniors are allowed to wear a White Polo Shirt.

Athletics
Plaquemine High athletics competes in the LHSAA. The school mascot is the Green Devil, which is also the nickname of the sports 
teams. 

The school offers football, basketball, baseball, softball, Dance Team "Dazzlers", cheerleading, track, volleyball, band, and wrestling.

Notable alumni 
Brian Mitchell, former NFL running back and kick returner; Louisiana-Lafayette and PHS quarterback under Coach Don M. Jones.
Jessel Ourso, sheriff of Iberville Parish, 1964-1968; 1972-1978
Davon Godchaux, NFL defensive tackle for the Miami Dolphins
Kevin Dotson, NFL offensive lineman for the Pittsburgh Steelers
Percy Butler, NFL defensive back for the Washington Commanders

Faculty 
 Carolyn Brown, French and English teacher c. 1965–1995; 1995 NFL Teacher of the Year (taught Brian Mitchell 9th-grade English)

See also
National Register of Historic Places listings in Iberville Parish, Louisiana

Notes

External links 
Plaquemine High School

PHS at Public School Review
PHS at Great Schools

Schools in Iberville Parish, Louisiana
Plaquemine Senior High School
Educational institutions established in 1894
School buildings on the National Register of Historic Places in Louisiana
Public middle schools in Louisiana
Public elementary schools in Louisiana
1894 establishments in Louisiana
National Register of Historic Places in Iberville Parish, Louisiana